Fenin may refer to:

 Fenin-Vilars-Saules, a Swiss municipality
 Yuriy Fenin (born 1977), Ukrainian professional footballer
 Martin Fenin (born 1987), Czech professional footballer